Nureddin Rifai (1899 – January 1980) was director of Lebanon's Internal Security Forces and the 25th Prime Minister of Lebanon.

Rifai was appointed to be Prime Minister by Suleiman Frangieh during Lebanon's short-lived military government. He served only three days before resigning his post in the face of tremendous protest.

References

1899 births
1980 deaths
Prime Ministers of Lebanon
Members of the Parliament of Lebanon